Jigonhsasee (alternately spelled Jikonhsaseh and Jikonsase, pronounced was an Iroquoian woman considered to be a co-founder, along with the Great Peacemaker and Hiawatha, of the Haudenosaunee (Iroquois) Confederacy sometime between AD 1142 and 1450; others place it closer to 1570–1600. Jigonhsasee became known as the Mother of Nations among the Iroquois.

Legend/Oral history
According to a short version of the Haudenosaunee oral tradition, an Iroquoian woman lived along the warriors' path. In some accounts she was referred to as Jigonhsasee; in others, she was given that name as a new one by the Great Peacemaker after he recognized her as an ally in making peace. She was known for her hospitality to warriors as they traveled to and from battlegrounds and their homes. At her hearth, warriors of the various factions could come in peace. While they ate her food, she acted as counsel and learned their hearts.

It is in this context that the Great Peacemaker (sometimes referred to by his name Deganawida, but out of respect this was not generally used) came to her and described his vision for a peace to be built upon a confederacy of the warring nations. She said this sounded good but asked what form it would take. He replied, "It will take the form of the longhouse in which there are many hearths, one for each family, yet all live as one household under one chief mother. They shall have one mind and live under one law. Thinking will replace killing, and there shall be one commonwealth."

The woman recognized the power in peace. The Great Peacemaker gave her the task of assigning the men to different positions at the peace gathering, and to women in the future the power to choose the chiefs of the longhouse. He called her Mother of Nations, as she was the first ally of his peace movement.

Commentary
Jacob Needleman, a contemporary American writer on religion, notes that in Iroquoian history, "through the mediation of a woman"..., "the mission of peace takes form in the world." In addition, "it is women's power of judgement that will ultimately determine the leadership of the Iroquois Confederacy." because the Great Peacemaker gave women the power to choose the chiefs who would represent their people at council. According to oral tradition, the Great Peacemaker, who brought Hiawatha and this woman together to create the Iroquois Confederacy, gave her a new name of Jigonhsaseh, saying that it meant New Face: "It is in your countenance that a New Mind is manifest."  Needleman writes further that "Out of the womb of the New Mind the nations will be born anew."
	 	
According to John Brown Childs, an American sociologist of Oneida, Massachusaug, and African-American ancestry, Jigonhsaseh means "she who lives on the road to war", as this important woman lived next to the warriors' path that ran from east to west. 
  	
Some scholars have suggested that the constitution of the Iroquois Confederacy influenced colonists who drafted the U.S. Constitution but there is no consensus on this.

Legacy and honors
Genetic researchers in the late 20th century named one of the five human mitochondrial DNA haplogroups (in the maternal line) found among Native American populations as Djigonasee in her honor.

See also
 List of peace activists

References

External links
, author's personal website
, posted by Public Bookshelf.com, said to be published in late 1800s

Iroquois people
Year of birth unknown
Year of death unknown